Beatrice Grant n. Campbell (1761-1845) was a Scottish author and teacher from Kilmartin in the early nineteenth centenary. She forged a career in publishing establishing herself as a female role model in an area other than domestic life.

Early life 
Grant was born and baptised in the village of Kilmartin in West Scotland on 2 September 1761.

She was the eldest daughter of Captain Neil Campbell of Duntroon who's military record includes serving as Captain in the Siege of Havana. Her mother, Matilda Capbell, died in childbirth on the 23rd September 1769 with the birth of her youngest daughter Neilliadh "Nelly" Campbell, when Grant was just 7 years old.

In total Grant had 16 siblings. Five whole siblings: Jean Campbell (born 2 Sep 1762), Mary Matilda Campbell (born 12 Jan 1764), Margaret Campbell (born 12 Jan 1765), Anne Campbell (born 19 Feb 1768), and Neilliadh "Nelly" Campbell (born 23 Sep 1769). She had eleven further half-siblings who were the product of her fathers second marriage to Jean Campbell in 1772. These were: Lieutenant James Campbell (1773 - 1799), Archibald Campbell (1775 - 1792), Major General Sir Neill Campbell (1776 - 1827),  Peter Campbell (1777 - 1777), Mary Meredith Campbell (1778 - unknown), General Patrick Campbell (1779 -1857), Argyle Campbell (1781 - 1783) Jean Campbell (1782 - 1868), Elizabeth Campbell (1783 - 1785), Helen Campbell (1784 -1808), and Elizabeth Campbell (1785 - 1878).

Work 
In 1784, Grant married the Rev. Patrick Grant, who was minister of the Inverness-shire parish of Duthill. The couple had four children together: Anna Trapaud Grant, Sir Patrick Grant, C.B., Capt. George William Trapaud Grant, and Capt. William Grant. After the death of her husband in 1810, Grant moved with her youngest children to Inverness where she established a school and boarding academy.

In 1812, Grant wrote her first book which was a guide for inexperienced mothers, however, after her youngest son and daughter died, she turned her hand to writing morality tales. Throughout her life she wrote many essays and fables for working class people on the moralities of life. She was a frequent feature in The Cheap Magazine, a magazine aimed to reach the working classes, as well as the more prestigious magazines La Belle Assemblée, New Monthly Magazine and Repository of Arts.

Her work was noted by the Poet, Dorothea Primrose Campbell, in her 1816 anthology Poems, honouring Grant with a poem entitled To Mrs Grant of Duthell. On Reading Her "Intellectual Education":.

Death 
Grant died on the 20th February 1845 at the age of 83

Selected publications 

 Sketches of intellectual education, and hints on domestic economy, addressed to inexperienced mothers: with an appendix, containing an essay on the instruction of the poor (1812) 
 Popular models and impressive warnings for the sons and daughters of industry (1815–16)
 Third Part of Popular Models, and Impressive Warnings for the Sons and Daughters of Industry (1816) 
 The history of an Irish family : in which, the unspeakable advantages of a virtuous education ... are strikingly exemplified ... To which is added ... The exemplary mother ; or, Dutiful parents and good children (1822)

References 

1761 births
1845 deaths
British women writers
Scottish women writers
19th-century Scottish writers
Scottish women novelists
19th-century British women writers
19th-century British writers
Inverness